Mamonkino is a rural locality (a village) in Chuchkovskoye Rural Settlement, Sokolsky District, Vologda Oblast, Russia. The population was 9 as of 2002.

Geography 
Mamonkino is located 85 km northeast of Sokol (the district's administrative centre) by road. Gorka is the nearest rural locality.

References 

Rural localities in Sokolsky District, Vologda Oblast